Grindelia integrifolia, common name Puget Sound gumweed, is a plant species known only from Oregon, Washington and British Columbia. It grows in wet meadows and marshlands.

Description

References

Flora of Washington (state)
Flora of Oregon
Flora of British Columbia
Flora without expected TNC conservation status